The men's heavyweight (91 kilograms) event at the 2010 Asian Games took place from 19 to 26 November 2010 at Lingnan Mingzhu Gymnasium, Foshan, China.

All bouts consisted of three three-minute rounds. The boxers receive points for every successful punch they land on their opponent's head or upper body. The boxer with the most points at the end of the bouts wins. Like all Asian Games boxing events, the competition was a straight single-elimination tournament. 

A total of 10 men from 10 countries competed in this event, limited to fighters whose body weight was less than 91 kilograms. Mohammad Ghossoun of Syria won the gold medal. He beat Manpreet Singh of India 8–1 in the final bout in Foshan Gymnasium. Jahon Qurbonov and Ali Mazaheri shared the bronze medal.

Schedule
All times are China Standard Time (UTC+08:00)

Results 
Legend
RSC — Won by referee stop contest

References

External links
Official website

Men's 091